The United States Senate Health Subcommittee on Employment and Workplace Safety is one of the three subcommittees within the Senate Committee on Health, Education, Labor and Pensions.

Jurisdiction
The Subcommittee has jurisdiction over a variety of employment issues including workforce education and training, worker health and safety, wage and hour laws, and workplace flexibility.

Members, 118th Congress

Historical subcommittee rosters

117th Congress

Notes and references

External links
Committee on Health, Employment & Workplace Safety Subcommittee page

Health Employment and Workplace Safety